Saalmulleria is a genus of moths in the family Cossidae.

Species
 Saalmulleria dubiefi Viette, 1974
 Saalmulleria stumpffi Saalmüller, 1884

References

External links
Natural History Museum Lepidoptera generic names catalog

Metarbelinae